Chinensis, Chinese in Latin, may refer to:

 Chinensis (katydid), a katydid genus
 a cultivar of Passiflora caerulea, the blue passion flower

See also